is a Japanese football player for ReinMeer Aomori.

Club statistics
Updated to 1 February 2020.

References

External links
Profile at ReinMeer Aomori

1988 births
Living people
Senshu University alumni
Association football people from Tokyo
Japanese footballers
J2 League players
J3 League players
Japan Football League players
Mito HollyHock players
FC Ryukyu players
ReinMeer Aomori players
Association football midfielders